Sitaula, or Sitoula, is a Brahmin surname of Nepal. This surname was given to Shankar Padhya Bhardwaj's sons because they came from sitouli gaon of india. Shankar Padhya Bhardwaj entered Nepal during the time when non-Muslims were forcibly being converted from Hindus to Muslims. People bearing this surname are originally from sitouli. Notable people with the name include:
 Bharat Sitaula, Nepali pop singer and producer 

Surnames of Nepalese origin
Khas surnames